Naked Gun is a 1956 American Western film starring Willard Parker and Mara Corday.

Plot

Cast

Production
It was filmed under the titles Sarazin Curse and The Hanging Judge.

References

External links

Naked Gun at TCMDB

1956 films
1956 Western (genre) films
American Western (genre) films
1950s English-language films
1950s American films
American black-and-white films